My Son the Fanatic is a short story written by Hanif Kureishi first published in The New Yorker in 1994. It was reprinted in Kureishi's 1997 collection of short stories, Love in a Blue Time, and also as a supplement to some editions of The Black Album, and in 1998 as a standalone edition. The short story was also adapted into a film of the same title.

Plot summary

The narrative deals with Parvez, a Pakistani immigrant in England, and his problems with his son Ali. Parvez worries about Ali's behaviour which has changed significantly. Early in the story, Parvez is afraid of discussing his worries with his friends because his son has always been a kind of showpiece son. Eventually, Parvez breaks his silence and tells them how his son has changed, hoping to receive some advice. After having a short conversation, they come to the conclusion that his son might be addicted to drugs and that he sells his things to earn money to buy drugs. After this meeting, Parvez goes to his taxi to drive home. But in his car he finds Bettina, a prostitute, who drives with Parvez very often and has become a confidante. Since Parvez has defended Bettina from a client who had attacked her, they take care of each other. Parvez tells Bettina what he has observed and that he and his friends assume that his son does all these strange things because he is drug addicted. Bettina instructs Parvez on how he has to observe his son to find out if there is anything physically wrong with him. However, after a few days of observations Parvez decides that his son appears totally healthy. The only physical change Parvez observes is that Ali is growing a beard. And it turns out that his son does not sell his things. He just gives them away.

Parvez notices that Ali prays five times a day, although he had not been brought up to be religious. Parvez decides to invite his son to dinner to talk to him about his recent behaviour. Initially, Ali refuses this invitation, but later he accepts it. Parvez drinks a lot during this meeting and they start to argue. Ali criticises his father's way of life because in his opinion his father is "too implicated in Western civilization" and breaks the Pakistani rules by drinking alcohol and eating pork.

Ali tells his father that he is going to give up his studies because, from his point of view, "Western education cultivates an anti-religious attitude". Parvez feels he has lost his son and wants to tell him to leave the house. But Bettina changes his mind and Parvez resolves to try to understand what is going on in his son's mind. During the next days Parvez tries to explain cautiously to his son what his ideas and attitudes towards life are. He even grows a beard to please Ali. But Ali still holds his father in contempt for not following the rules of the Qur'an. A few days later while Parvez is driving in his taxi with Bettina he sees his son walking down the sidewalk. Parvez asks Ali to come in and drive with them. In the car, Bettina starts to have a conversation with Ali, but as she tries to explain to Ali that his father loves him very much, Ali becomes angry and offends Bettina. Afterwards he wants to escape from the car, but Bettina prevents him. She leaves the car when it is still moving and runs away. Back at home Parvez drinks a lot of alcohol because he is furious at his son. He walks into Ali's room and attacks his son who does not show any kind of reaction to protect or defend himself.
When Parvez stops hitting him, Ali asks his father: "So who's the fanatic now?"

The Short Story in Comparison to the Film 

The film differs significantly from the short story. The order of events is changed and new events and characters are added. Even the name Ali is changed to Farid. The short story is set in London, South East of England, and the film is set in Bradford which lies in Northern England. The new characters in the film are "the maulvi from Lahore, Fizzie and Herr Schitz." (Moore- Gilbert 2001: 164)

Another important invention of the film is the change of the relationship between Parvez and Bettina. In the short story it is mentioned that Bettina and Parvez take "care for each other" (Kureishi 1997: 151) since Parvez has protected Bettina of a very violent client. We do not learn that in the film. It is also mentioned in the text that Parvez can "talk to her about things he'd never be able to discuss with his own wife". This shows that they are good friends and trust each other, but in the text there is no evidence that the prostitute Bettina and the taxi- driver Parvez have a love affair as in the film. In the film this "sexual dimension" (Moore- Gilbert 2001: 164) is developed to show how Farid leads his father into despair.

At home Parvez does not have a partner to communicate with. His wife, Minoo, who is rarely mentioned and not named in the short story, is always doing work and doesn't talk much with her husband. The main thing they talk about is Parvez's job. Therefore, Minoo is a more complex figure in the film than in the text. She develops from the loving mother which she is in the opening scene to the "servant in her own home after the deric's arrival, even being required to eat apart from her husband." (Moore- Gilbert 2001: 166)

The character of Schitz, the German entrepreneur who is present through nearly the entire film, is one of the more complex characters of those added in the film. Schitz can be seen as a "comparison with Parvez, reminding the audience that there are different kinds of economic migrants, whose reception by the 'host' society varies according to the migrants national origin, class and ethnic identity." (Moore- Gilbert 2001: 165) Schitz represents industrial renewal and revolution. He comes from Germany, which has just been united again, to Great Britain and "represents the growing influence of Europe on Britain, in which a newly united Germany is the economic dynamo and, as such, a potentially oppressive force." (Moore- Gilbert 2001: 166) With reference to business, Schitz is a stereotype of the successful white businessman with a lot of money. He likes to spend his money and to look down on people of other social classes as he does in the case of Parvez. In the film Schitz jokes about Parvez when Parvez tells him that he always wanted to be in the cricket team of the company he worked for when he came to England. Later in the nightclub, Schitz also laughs at Parvez because of his Pakistani accent. This accent is a feature the film uses to create cultural differences. The father who leads a western life speaks English with a Pakistani accent whereas his son who is a fundamentalist speaks Standard English.

You may also see Mr. Schitz as the contrast to Farid's world. Mr. Schitz embodies everything that Farid hates about the Western World. Although Farid is in conflict with his father and not with Mr. Schitz and does not even know him, these two characters represent the two conflicting ways of life. Farid is the religious fundamentalist and Mr. Schitz is a godless libertine.

Farid's, or Ali's; new attitudes towards the world he has lived in since his birth lead to a very big conflict between him and his father. This conflict is in the short story and in the film which both start in media represented at the beginning. The short story opens with Parvez sitting in Ali's room. The narrator who is not part of the story and therefore a heterodiegetic narrator narrates that Parvez is "bewildered" (Kureishi 1997: 147) by the fact that his son is getting tidier. He also explained briefly Ali's old behaviour to give reason for Parvez worries. Then the reader learns that Ali had an "English girlfriend from whom he has parted." (Kureishi 1997: 147) The film opens with a scene that shows Farid's family at a visit at the Fingerhut's house. Parvez is very enthusiastic and already plans his son's wedding. The short story creates at its opening a very calm atmosphere of an average father worrying about his son. There cannot be found any hints than the names that they are not a family of British origin. Whereas in the film, it is obvious from the beginning Parvez's family has emigrated to Britain. Parvez's wife is dressed in traditional Pakistani clothes, but she does not have her face veiled, Parvez speaks with his Pakistani accent and Minoo and Parvez speak Urdu, their native language, to each other.

At the beginning, Farid seems ashamed of his father when he is taking the pictures of the Fingerhuts. But his shame initially looks like the usual embarrassment teenagers sometimes have for their parents and not the disgust that Farid, and Ali, develops throughout the story. The short story says that Parvez and Ali once "were brothers". (Kureishi 1997: 150) But that is a thing which Parvez tells the reader and the reader does not learn anything about Ali's view of this. This statement underlines Parvez's worries about his son. In the text and the film, Parvez is presented as a loving father who wants the best for his son. He always was "aware of the pitfalls that other men's sons had stumbled to in England." (Kureishi 2001: 148) He wants to give his son a better life than he once had. That is the reason for him to work "long hours" (Kureishi 2001: 149) and to spend a lot of money on his son's education. And while Parvez was dreaming of a better life in Britain he did not realise that something had gone wrong with his son.

After a conversation with his friends and with Bettina Parvez worries about his son taking drugs. In the film it is shown how Parvez checks Farid's temperature. Farid's reaction shows that he knows what his father is looking for and therefore he stretches out his arm to show his veins. While Parvez keeps his son under surveillance he follows him into the mosque. There Parvez is confronted with the fact that his son is not just becoming religious. He changes to a fundamentalist. A Muslim in the mosque tells Parvez that those boys, the group of boys which includes his own son, are not welcomed in the mosque because they always want to change the people's opinion.

Farid is presented in a more radical way in the film than in the short story. In the short story Ali shows his disgust for his father in the conversation they have when they are out for dinner. Ali offends his father, but does not do anything more. He just wants to state his view of things. Whereas at the nearly end of the film Farid and his friends attack the prostitutes violently. They throw Molotov cocktails into the prostitutes' house and Farid spits at Bettina. This violence may be seen as an influence the maulvi took on them because he is added in the film and does not exist in the short story where an attack like that does not happen. The maulvi takes very much influence on Farid and helps him to become more fanatic. He even gives introductions, as Farid tells Parvez in Fizzie's restaurant, when they are having dinner. Farid trusts more the maulvi ideals of life than his fathers.

Further reading
Bart Moore-Gilbert: Hanif Kureishi (Contemporary World Writers) (Manchester University Press, 2001).
Hanif Kureishi. "The Road Exactly: Introduction to My Son the Fanatic." Collected Essays. Faber & Faber, 2011. 235–241.
Andreas Gaile, ed. My Son the Fanatic: A Screenplay. Reclam (Fremdsprachentexte). Stuttgart: Reclam, 2007. With an Afterword by the editor.

1999 short stories
British short stories
British novellas
Novels set in London
Postcolonial literature
Works originally published in The New Yorker
Novels by Hanif Kureishi
British novels adapted into films